The Red Rose (original title "La Rose rouge") is a French comedy film from 1951, directed by Marcello Pagliero, written by Robert Scipion and starring Françoise Arnoul and Louis de Funès.

Cast

References

External links 
 
 La Rose rouge (1951) at the Films de France

1951 films
French comedy films
1950s French-language films
French black-and-white films
Films directed by Marcello Pagliero
1951 comedy films
1950s French films